A leadership election was held by the Democratic Action Party (DAP) on 15 December 2012.

Central Executive Committee election results
[ Source]

References

2012 elections in Malaysia
Democratic Action Party leadership election
Democratic Action Party leadership elections